The 5th Infantry Division, Philippine Army, known officially as the Star Division, is the Philippine Army's primary infantry unit in Northern Luzon, and specializes in anti-guerrilla warfare.

History
The division traces its history to the organization of the 5th Army Brigade on October 16, 1972, as a major unit of the Philippine Army pursuant to General Orders Number 153, General Headquarters, Armed Forces of the Philippines with its station located in Camp Servillano S. Aquino in San Miguel, Tarlac. Brig. Gen. Miguel M. Villamor was appointed as the Commanding General and the unit's territorial jurisdiction covered Zambales, Bataan, Bulacan, Pampanga, and portion of Quezon - north of Umiray River. On March 29, 1976, Col. Benjamin G. Santos took charge of the Brigade.

On May 11, 1981, the 5th Army Brigade (Separate) was elevated and became known as the 5th Infantry Division pursuant to General Orders Number 365, GHQ, AFP to address the growing threat of the local communist movement.

The 5th Infantry Division became distinguished as it spearheaded several campaigns against the local communist movement starting from the renowned Marag Valley in Cagayan, which was their sanctuary where the Headquarters of the Far North Luzon Regional Party Committee of the Northern Luzon Commission was discovered. It was also the training base of the communist forces coming from other NPA units. Marag Valley is a vast forest land extending from the foot of Mt. Siamsanderie in Luna, Apayao to the Malababie Valley in Pamplona, Cagayan. Most of the land area is thickly forested which gives an impression of “virginity” and settlements are found along the mighty Marag River. From 1990-1993, massive operations were launched to restore peace and order situation in the area and continued operations were pursued in the areas of Paco-Zinundungan complex in the same province to Mabiga-Poguin complex in Isabela.

The campaign called for the proper orchestration and synchronization of efforts of the Army with various sector organizations and the local government.

In effect, the masses started to withdraw their support from the local communist movement while several members gave up and/or surrendered to the government renouncing the bloody communist struggle. Support in urban areas fell and by 1991, they merely had some 18,000 available. The Army with the full support of various sector organizations and the local government units pressed on with the momentum to put an end to the insurgency.

In an act of desperation, the communists became suspicious of its members and began a massive internal purge of the movement that killed thousands of partisans and members on accusations of being deep penetration agents and informers of the AFP. They also started to target US servicemen with their assassination teams called "Sparrow Units" but these activities only lost them yet more support.

These solid gains serve today as the foundation of a very manageable security environment and an irreversible socio-economic up-trend in favor of the populace in Northern Luzon.

On November 7, 1994, the home of the 5th Infantry Division was transferred to Camp Upi in Gamu, Isabela and is now called Camp Melchor F Dela Cruz. The Headquarters directs and employs three infantry brigades with its operationally controlled infantry battalions strategically positioned in the provinces of Ilocos Norte, Ilocos Sur, Kalinga, Apayao, Cagayan, Isabela, Ifugao, Quirino and Nueva Vizcaya.

In an effort to contribute greatly in the prevailing peace and order situation in the country, the Division sent combat units to Mindanao, particularly in Basilan and Jolo-Sulu area to bring an end to the terrorist Abu Sayyaf Group. After the 77th Infantry Battalion made a remarkable stint in the area from 1999-2001, it was replaced with the full-complement of the 53rd Division Reconnaissance Company last November 2006 to June 2007 and has significantly contributed in the hunt to destroy the notorious terrorist Abu Sayyaf Group.

The stable security environment in the areas of Northern Luzon has been laboriously achieved through the years by the diligence and selfless sacrifice of the officers and men of the 5th Infantry Division, now under the leadership of MGen Pablo M Lorenzo. AFP.

Mission

The mission of the 5th Infantry Division is to conduct internal security operations in the Ilocos, Cagayan Valley, and Cordillera Administrative Regions to destroy the communist terrorists and other threat groups in order to establish a physically and psychologically secured environment conducive to economic development.

Current units

Battalions

 77th Infantry (Don't Dare The Double Seven) Battalion (Cadre)
 17th Infantry (Do or Die) Battalion
 21st Infantry (Invincible) Battalion
 45th Infantry (Gallant) Battalion
 54th Infantry (Magilas) Battalion
 41st Infantry (Parter for Peace) Battalion
 50th Infantry (Defender) Battalion
 86th Infantry (Highlander) Battalion
 95th Infantry (Salaknib) Battalion
 98th Infantry (Masinag) Battalion
 103rd Infantry (Mabalasik) Battalion

Brigades

 501st Infantry (Valiant) Brigade
 502nd Infantry (Liberator) Brigade
 503rd Infantry (Justice and Peace) Brigade

Operations
 Anti-guerrilla operations against the New People's Army

References

 Official Site of the PA 5ID.

Infantry divisions of the Philippines
Military units and formations established in 1981
Military units and formations of the Philippine Army